In botanical nomenclature, variety (abbreviated var.; in ) is a taxonomic rank below that of species and subspecies, but above that of  form. As such, it gets a three-part infraspecific name. It is sometimes recommended that the subspecies rank should be used to recognize geographic distinctiveness, whereas the variety rank is appropriate if the taxon is seen throughout the geographic range of the species.

Example
The pincushion cactus, Escobaria vivipara (Nutt.) Nine varieties have been described. Where the varieties of the pincushion cactus meet, they intergrade. The variety Escobaria vivipara var. arizonica is from Arizona, while Escobaria vivipara var. neo-mexicana is from New Mexico.

See also Capsicum annuum var. glabriusculum

Definitions

The term is defined in different ways by different authors. However, the International Code of Nomenclature for Cultivated Plants, while recognizing that the word "variety" is often used to denote "cultivar", does not accept this usage. Variety  is defined in the code as follows: "Variety (varietas) the category in the botanical nomenclatural hierarchy between species and form (forma)". The code acknowledges the other usage as follows: "term used in some national and international legislation for a clearly distinguishable taxon below the rank of species; generally, in legislative texts, a term equivalent to cultivar. See also: cultivar and variety (varietas)".

A variety will have an appearance distinct from other varieties, but will hybridize freely with those other varieties (if brought into contact).

Other nomenclature uses
 In plant breeding nomenclature, at least in countries that are signatory to the UPOV Convention, "variety" or "plant variety" is a legal term.
 In zoological nomenclature, the only allowed rank below that of species is that of subspecies. A name that was published before 1961 as that of a variety is taken to be the name of a subspecies. A name published after 1960 as that of a variety does not formally exist. In zoology, forms and morphs are used informally if needed, but are unregulated by the ICZN. 
 In bacteriological nomenclature, "variety" is not allowed, but names published as varieties before 1992 are taken to be published as subspecies.
 In viticulture nomenclature, what is referred to as "grape varieties" are in reality cultivars according to usage in the International Code of Nomenclature for Cultivated Plants or "plant varieties" in the legal sense rather than botanical  taxonomy varieties, since they are propagated by cuttings and have properties that are not stable under sexual reproduction. However, usage of the term variety is so entrenched in viticulture that a change to cultivar is unlikely.

See also
Cultivar
Hybrid (biology)
Plant variety (law)
Protection of Plant Varieties and Farmers' Rights Act of 2001 (India)
Race (biology)
Subvariety
Trinomial nomenclature

References

Bibliography 

 
 

Variety
Plant taxonomy